Jörg Schmidt-Reitwein (born 1939 in Königs Wusterhausen, Germany) is a German cinematographer. He has collaborated with director Werner Herzog on a number of projects. Among his many collaborations with other directors, Schmidt-Reitwein is known for shooting Alan Greenberg's acclaimed 1982 documentary about Jamaica and death of Bob Marley, Land of Look Behind.

Biography

Early life and family
The son of painter Karl Schmidt-Reitwein, Jörg Schmidt-Reitwein was raised in Lübeck. His mother Barbara was the niece of Edvard Munchs patron Max Linde and painters Hermann Linde and Heinrich Linde-Walther.

Early career
After attending Waldorfschool, Schmidt-Reitwein studied physics for a few semesters in Lübeck, before moving to Berlin in 1959 to pursue a career in film. His career stalled when he was arrested in East Berlin after attempting to smuggle his girlfriend over the Berlin Wall to West-Berlin. Sentenced to five years imprisonment, he was released after three years when the West German government negotiated his freedom against 84,000 DM worth of butter.

Career as a cinematographer
Following his release from prison, Schmidt-Reitwein worked as a camera assistant in Munich. In 1969 Werner Herzog offered him the chance to work on a documentary feature film as director of photography. The film Fata Morgana was widely praised by critics. Schmidt-Reitwein worked with Herzog on 17 more movies and documentary films. He also worked with several well known directors including Douglas Sirk, Alexander Kluge, Herbert Achternbusch, Josef Bierbichler, H.C. Blumenberg, Werner Schroeter, Alan Greenberg, Valie Export, Doris Dörrie, Jochen Kuhn, Markus Fischer, Douglas Wolfsperger and Andre Heller. He earned two German Film Prize trophies awarded in gold for his light speciality on two films he collaborated with Werner Herzog.

Schmidt-Reitwein had worked in the Ludwigsburg Film Academy and the Film Academy of the University of the Philippines in Manila as a Lecturer.

He also works for TV, shooting commercials for Nike, DHL, MasterCard, Swiss Com and Mercedes-Benz.

Personal life
Schmidt-Reitwein is the father of five children. From his first marriage with Erika Kaul he is the father to his oldest daughter Iris Maria (b. 1966), from his second marriage with Susanne Rupprecht to son Tobias and daughters Lara and Lisa. Together with his third wife he has raised his youngest daughter Ana.

He lives on a farm in Lower Bavaria.

Filmography (incomplete)

 Fata Morgana
 The Great Ecstasy of Woodcarver Steiner
 The Enigma of Kaspar Hauser
 Nosferatu the Vampyre
 Heart of Glass
 Woyzeck
 Land of Look Behind
 Where the Green Ants Dream
 Marmorera
 Wie zwischen Himmel und Erde
Land of Silence and Darkness

Awards
 2 Federal Film Awards (Film ribbon in gold)
 2 nominations for the German Camera Prize
 1 nomination for the Festival de l image de Film (Chalon sur Soune)
 Jury member Cameraimage 2001
 First Prize for DOP work on FANTASY FILM FESTIVAL 2007 in Málaga (Spain)

References

External links
 
 Official site
 Filmography Jörg Schmidt-Reitwein (IEC) 

1939 births
Film people from Brandenburg
German cinematographers
Living people
People from Königs Wusterhausen
People from the Province of Brandenburg
Waldorf school alumni